Negasi Krestos was the ruling prince of Shewa (reigned c. 1682 — c. 1703), an important Amhara noble of Ethiopia. Although the official account is that his father Lesba Qal (lord of Agancha, in Menz) was a male-line great-grandson of Prince Yaqob, son of Emperor Lebna Dengel, and thus descended in male line from the Solomonic dynasty (this version, told by Serta Wold, a councilor of Sahle Selassie, has been criticized as a later fabrication of genealogy, in order to help the imperial designs of his heirs two centuries later), other versions are known of his ancestry. Abir records two other traditions collected in the 1840s: one is that his mother, Senebelt, was a woman of imperial descent and his father a rich landowner from Menz; another is that Senebelt was the daughter of one Ras Faris, "who with many other followers of Emperor Susenyos escaped into Menz."

After fighting the Wollo and Yejju Oromo north of Menz, he subdued the Oromo living in the district of Yifat, which came to replace Menz as the center of the Shewan lordship. His further conquests included the districts of Debdabo, Mengist, Makfud, Doqaqit and Asundabe. Through these he succeeded in establishing an autonomous state of Shewa by the end of 17th century. Pankhurst credits Negasi Krestos with moving the capital of Shewa to Debre Berhan from the old center in Tegulet; Nagasi's stone palace was still visible when Rochet d'Hericourt visited Debre Berhan in 1840.

In the early years of the 18th century, Negasi travelled to Gondar to pay homage to Emperor Iyasu I, where he died of smallpox. According to Donald Levine, Negasi was buried in the church Fit Abbo, "where his grave -- as well as the field he camped on, Nagassi Meda -- remain objects of historical interest today." He did not succeed in obtaining the title Meridazmach, which later was unilaterally adopted by his son and heir Sebestyanos. His death away from his domain plunged Shewa into a period of disorder, and the territories he conquered reverted to their original rulers.

Notes 

Rulers of Shewa
Deaths from smallpox
Infectious disease deaths in Ethiopia
1703 deaths
17th-century Ethiopian people
18th-century Ethiopian people
Year of birth unknown